Nettlestone is a village on the Isle of Wight, England about  south east from Ryde. It is listed in the Domesday Book and was established c.1086. Together with Seaview, it forms the civil parish of Nettlestone and Seaview.

The Priory Bay Hotel between Nettlestone & St Helens is said to be haunted by the ghost of a young lady who died there at the age of 14.

Public Transport is provided by Southern Vectis bus route 8, which operates between Ryde and Newport via Seaview, Bembridge and Sandown including intermediate villages, once an hour from Ryde bus station.

The local school is Nettlestone Primary which has taught local children since 1905. It moved to its current location in January 1906.

The village is home to the Bucks School Camp Association on Eddington Road.

Virginia Bottomley was elevated to the peerage as Baroness Bottomley of Nettlestone  when she retired from the House of Commons in 2005.

References

Villages on the Isle of Wight